Ronnie Mallett (born January 20, 1960) is a former American football player and member of the College Football Hall of Fame.

Mallett was selected as an All-NAIA wide receiver during the 1979, 1980 and 1981 seasons. He was elected to the College Football Hall of Fame in 2006, the only player from the University of Central Arkansas to be so honored.

References 

1960 births
Living people
Central Arkansas Bears football players
College Football Hall of Fame inductees
Sportspeople from Pine Bluff, Arkansas
Players of American football from Arkansas
American football wide receivers